Khareh may refer to:
 Khareh, Isfahan
 Khareh-ye Aghlan, West Azerbaijan Province
 Khareh-ye Chaki, West Azerbaijan Province